Events from the year 1925 in Taiwan, Empire of Japan.

Incumbents

Central government of Japan
 Prime Minister: Katō Takaaki

Taiwan
 Governor-General – Takio Izawa

Births
 22 March – Wang Yu-yun, Mayor of Kaohsiung City (1973-1981).
 25 July – Chiu Chuang-huan, President of Examination Yuan (1993-1996).
 20 November – Chen Wen-yu, former botanist, horticulturist.

References

 
Years of the 20th century in Taiwan